Raam Reddy is an Indian film director, writer and photographer. He made his directorial debut with the 2016 Kannada film Thithi, which premiered at the 68th Locarno International Film Festival on 8 August 2015, where it won the Golden Leopard in the "Filmmakers of the Present" category as well as the First Feature award.

The film won numerous other awards at various film festivals including Prabhat- Best International Director at Pune_International_Film_Festivalune International Film Festival Palm Springs, Mumbai, and Marrakech. It was also invited to be a part of the 45th edition of New Directors/New Films. At the 19th Shanghai International Film Festival, Thithi won the Best Script Writer and the Best Film awards under the Asia New Talent Awards Category. It won the German Star of India award for the Best Feature Film at the 13th Indian Film Festival Stuttgart, Germany. At the 63rd National Film Awards, the film won the National Film Award for Best Feature Film in Kannada.

Early life
After graduating from St. Stephen's College, Delhi, Raam Reddy went on to study Film Direction at Prague Film School.

Career
Before his directorial venture Thithi , Raam wrote and directed many short films, most notable among them is a Telugu short film called 'Ika' which won multiple awards and was screened at over 20 International film festivals. At the age of 21, Raam wrote his first book It's Raining in Maya.

At 16, Raam held an exhibition on wild life photography where he displayed his work at the Time and Space Art Gallery. Proceeds from the exhibition went to the Asian Nature Conservation Foundation (ANCF)

In February 2016, Forbes included Raam Reddy in the 30 Under 30 list of achievers.

Selected filmography
Thithi (2016; directorial debut)
Ika (Telugu short film)

Personal life
He is the grandson of the first chief minister of Karnataka K. C. Reddy.

References

Year of birth missing (living people)
Living people
Kannada film directors
Film producers from Karnataka
Kannada screenwriters
Film directors from Karnataka
St. Stephen's College, Delhi alumni
Screenwriters from Karnataka